Meriden is a city in Jefferson County, Kansas, United States.  As of the 2020 census, the population of the city was 744.

History
Meriden was founded in 1872. It was named by a pioneer settler for his former hometown of Meriden, New Hampshire.

Geography
Meriden is located at  (39.1890, -95.5684).

Demographics

Meriden is part of the Topeka, Kansas Metropolitan Statistical Area.

2010 census
As of the census of 2010, there were 813 people, 315 households, and 215 families living in the city. The racial makeup of the city was 96.8% White, 1.4% Native American, 0.2% Asian, and 1.6% from two or more races. Hispanic or Latino of any race were 2.2% of the population.

There were 315 households, of which 43.2% had children under the age of 18 living with them, 43.5% were married couples living together, 15.2% had a female householder with no husband present, 9.5% had a male householder with no wife present, and 31.7% were non-families. 25.7% of all households were made up of individuals, and 9.2% had someone living alone who was 65 years of age or older. The average household size was 2.58 and the average family size was 3.12.

The median age in the city was 33.5 years. 30.3% of residents were under the age of 18; 9.5% were between the ages of 18 and 24; 26.8% were from 25 to 44; 25.3% were from 45 to 64; and 8.2% were 65 years of age or older. The gender makeup of the city was 51.2% male and 48.8% female.

2000 census
As of the census of 2000, there were 706 people, 260 households, and 198 families living in the city. The racial makeup of the city was 97.17% White, 0.99% Native American, 0.14% from other races, and 1.70% from two or more races. Hispanic or Latino of any race were 0.99% of the population.

There were 260 households, out of which 45.4% had children under the age of 18 living with them, 54.6% were married couples living together, 16.9% had a female householder with no husband present, and 23.5% were non-families. 20.4% of all households were made up of individuals, and 6.9% had someone living alone who was 65 years of age or older. The average household size was 2.72 and the average family size was 3.14.

In the city, the population was spread out, with 32.4% under the age of 18, 7.8% from 18 to 24, 33.7% from 25 to 44, 16.9% from 45 to 64, and 9.2% who were 65 years of age or older. The median age was 31 years. For every 100 females, there were 101.7 males. For every 100 females age 18 and over, there were 94.7 males.

The median income for a household in the city was $40,221, and the median income for a family was $45,278. Males had a median income of $35,515 versus $25,769 for females. The per capita income for the city was $16,008. About 4.5% of families and 5.9% of the population were below the poverty line, including 7.5% of those under age 18 and 1.8% of those age 65 or over.

Education
The community is served by Jefferson West USD 340 public school district.

References

External links

 City of Meriden
 Meriden - Directory of Public Officials
 Meriden City Map, KDOT

Cities in Kansas
Cities in Jefferson County, Kansas
Topeka metropolitan area, Kansas